Anthony Rock (born June 30, 1974) is an American actor and stand-up comedian. He is the younger brother of comedian Chris Rock. He is best known for playing Uncle Ryan on Everybody Hates Chris (2008–2009), and television producer Dirk Black on the UPN/The CW series All of Us (2003–2007). Rock also appeared in many films including What Goes Around Comes Around (2012) and Redemption of a Dog (2012).

Rock was a co-star on CBS's comedy Living Biblically, co-starring with Jay Ferguson, Lindsey Kraft, Camryn Manheim, and Sara Gilbert.

Biography
Rock was born in Brooklyn, New York. The son of Rosalie Rock and Julius Rock (d. 1988), he grew up on Decatur Street in the Bedford-Stuyvesant neighborhood of New York City. He has seven brothers and two sisters.

In the early 2000s, Rock hosted a short-lived game show entitled Can You Tell? for the Oxygen network. He was also a correspondent for BattleBots on Comedy Central for the show's fifth season.

Rock has appeared on radio and television shows including The Howard Stern Show and The D'Angelo Show. He performed in New York with Mark Curry and John Henton to highlight the Apollo Theater. He co-starred as Dirk Black on the UPN/The CWsitcom All of Us. Rock has often worked as a back-up to his brother Chris, and appeared on the latter's sitcom Everybody Hates Chris in the recurring role of the title character's uncle Ryan. Chris's fictitious brother Drew from the show is loosely based on Tony. Rock has hosted The Funny Spot on TV One.

Rock starred in his own sketch comedy TV series, The Tony Rock Project, which was broadcast on MyNetworkTV from 2008 to 2009. On February 19, 2010, Comedy Central aired Tony Rock's feature on Season 14 of Comedy Central Presents. His episode was the first original of the 2010 season.

In 2012, Rock appeared in Think Like a Man, a feature film based on Steve Harvey's 2009 book Act Like a Lady, Think Like a Man. In the same year Rock appeared in David E. Talbert's What Goes Around Comes Around and began hosting Apollo Live on BET.

In 2022, he appeared on the Netflix baking competition Is It Cake? as a judge. In early April 2022, a video surfaced online of Rock performing a stand-up show while reacting to the Oscars incident where his brother Chris Rock was physically assaulted on stage by Will Smith after he had made comments on Smith's wife's bald appearance.

Filmography

Film

Television

References

External links
 Official website
 Rock the World Inc. website
 
 Tony Rock's biography on Filmbug

1974 births
Living people
People from Bedford–Stuyvesant, Brooklyn
African-American male actors
African-American stand-up comedians
American stand-up comedians
American male film actors
American male television actors
American people of Cameroonian descent
Comedians from New York City
Male actors from New York City
21st-century American comedians
21st-century African-American people
20th-century African-American people
Chris Rock